Vassilios Skouris (born 6 March 1948) is a Greek judge who was President of the European Court of Justice from 2003 to 2015. A European legal scholar, he served briefly in the government of Greece as Minister of the Interior in 1989 and again in 1996. He is professor at the Law School of the Aristotle University and at Bucerius Law School in Hamburg, Germany.

Early years and education
Skouris was born on 6 March 1948 in Thessaloniki, Greece.

He graduated with a degree in law from the Free University of Berlin in 1970, and was subsequently awarded doctorate in constitutional and administrative law at the University of Hamburg in 1973.
In 1978 he was a professor of Public Law at Bielefeld University and in 1982 a professor of Public Law at the University of Thessaloniki. During the period of 1972 to 1977 he was lecturing law at the University of Hamburg.

Greek Minister of the Interior
Following the dissolution of the Greek parliament in 1989, Skouris served as the Minister of the Interior briefly during the caretaker government. He served another short stint in 1996.

Notable positions
Skouris was the President of the Greek Association for European Law between 1992–1994, Director of the Centre for International and European Economic Law in 1997, and President of the Greek Economic and Social Council in 1998. He has also served as a Member of the Scientific Committee of the Greek Ministry of Foreign Affairs between 1997–1999, Administrative Board of the Greek National Judges' College between 1995–1996, Greek National Research Committee between 1993–1995, Higher Selection Board for Greek Civil Servants between 1994–1996, and the Academic Council of the Academy of European Law in 1995. He was a member of the Board of Guardians of the Academy of European Law of Trier.

Since 10 May 2017 he has been the second chairman of the Adjudicatory Chamber of the FIFA Ethics Committee, succeeding the German Hans-Joachim Eckert.

European Court of Justice

On 8 June 1999, the member states of the European Union agreed to the appointment of Skouris to the Court of Justice of the European Communities, or European Court of Justice. Following his first term, the justices of the court elected him as their President on 7 October 2003, and again on 7 October 2009. Koen Lenaerts, who had been Vice-President since 2012, succeeded him as President on 8 October 2015.

Landmark rulings
President Skouris has presided over several landmark rulings since joining the court, including B.F. Cadman v. Health & Safety Executive (C-17/05), decided in 2006, which held that pay scales based on seniority were not gender discrimination, unless it could be proved otherwise that seniority was not the discriminatory factor. Other notable cases include Brian Francis Collins v. Secretary of State for Work and Pensions (C-138/02), decided in 2004, which struck down a discriminatory employment benefits law in the United Kingdom, allowing access to benefits for those of an EU nationality, and Commission of the European Communities v. Federal Republic of Germany C-112/05 which struck down the "Volkswagen Law", against the wishes of the German government and labor unions. In "The Viking Case", International Transport Workers' Federation, Finnish Seamen's Union v. Viking Line ABP, OÜ Viking Line Eesti (C-438/05), decided in 2007, it was determined that an employer who seeks cost-effective labor in a member state cannot have business freedom privileges infringed by trade unions unless the aim of the union is to protect workers in accordance with the public interest.

Another notable case includes Coleman v Attridge Law, in which the court ruled that a mother whose job was terminated for requesting specific hours because of having to care for a disabled child was entitled to protection from disability discrimination. It struck down a United Kingdom law that only permitted protection for the actual individual who was disabled.
As a significant result of the ECJ intervention, associative discrimination became a part of the UK Equality Act 2010.

Controversies
In 2009, the court rendered a landmark decision in Apostolides v Orams, which forced the owner of a vacation villa from the United Kingdom to vacate their property rights for victims of the Turkish invasion of Cyprus in 1974, who had fled and lost their land. The neutrality of President Skouris was questioned because of his acceptance of the Grand Collar of the Order of Makarios III of the Republic of Cyprus in 2006 and visits with the leadership of the southern portion of the island, where many refugees remain, months before the ruling.

Speeches and views
In a speech in 2004, President Skouris indicated he believed that the Court of Justice served as a supreme court instead of just a constitutional court.

In a speech in 2006 at the European Conference on Subsidiarity, he described the role of the subsidiarity principle with the court, linking it to Quadragesimo anno. He stated "what individuals can do on their own initiative and out of their own efforts, should not be taken away from them and allocated to the community, for it would be against justice for the larger entities to assume what the small entities can achieve and bring to a positive end... Subsidiarity protects small communities against being deprived of tasks by a central power to a greater extent as necessary.” He also discussed proportionality, which he says "protects individuals against a restriction to an unnecessary extent of their rights by a measure benefiting the community."

In 2007, he visited the Southern Methodist University's Dedman School of Law in Dallas, along with justices from the United States Supreme Court, and attended events at the Dallas Bar Association and the Dallas Committee on Foreign Relations, while delivering a speech on the role of the Court of Justice in the EU to the pro-business Greater Dallas Chamber of Commerce.

At the 50th anniversary celebration for the court in 2009, President Skouris spoke about the court's earlier years of abstaining from issues of individual fundamental rights within each country but, with the new Charter of Fundamental Rights, expressed a desire, in accordance with such, to improve the rights of citizens within member nations.

Honours and awards

He has Honorable distinctions by the Greek, Italian, Cypriot, Romanian, Austrian, and French governments.
He has a Rank of Commander in National Order of the Legion of Honor of the French Republic. 
He is the Corresponding member of Ακαδημία Αθηνών(Academy of Athens). 
He is the honorary doctorates of: the Administrative College of Speyer (Germany), the University of Vilnius (Lithuania), the Democritus University of Thrace, the University of Münster (Germany),the University of Athens and the University of Bucarest, University Paris 2 Panthéon-Assas, the University of Masaryk (Brno), The Panteion University  (Athens), of Heidelberg University.

See also

List of members of the European Court of Justice

References

|-

|-

1948 births
20th-century Greek lawyers
Living people
Ministers of the Interior of Greece
Presidents of the European Court of Justice
Grand Crosses of the Order of the Star of Romania
Greek judges of international courts and tribunals
21st-century Greek judges
Politicians from Thessaloniki